{{DISPLAYTITLE:C22H26O11}}
The molecular formula C22H26O11 (molar mass: 466.43 g/mol, exact mass: 466.147512 u) may refer to: 

 Agnuside
 Curculigoside A

Molecular formulas